The Cloudbuster Ultralights Cloudbuster is an American ultralight aircraft that was designed and produced by the Cloudbuster Ultralights Company of Sarasota, Florida in the early 1980s. The aircraft was supplied as a kit for amateur construction.

Design and development
It features a strut-braced high-wing, a single-seat, open cockpit, tricycle landing gear and a single engine in tractor configuration.

The aircraft fuselage structure is made from bolted-together aluminum tubing, with a tubular keel supporting the tail, wing mounts and the engine at the front. Its  span wing is braced with a single lift strut per side. The wing is of exotic mixed construction, with aluminum tubular spars, urethane foam and fibreglass wing ribs, the leading edge is vinyl-covered and the trailing edge is sheet aluminum and the whole wing finished in doped aircraft fabric covering. The pilot sits on an open seat that is not equipped with a windshield. The landing gear features main wheel suspension and a steerable nosewheel. The airframe was proof tested to +4.5/-2.25 g.

The complex wing does give the aircraft good gliding performance, achieving a 13:1 glide ratio and a minimum sink speed of 260 ft/min (1.3 m/s).
However the complexity of the wing construction lead to the commercial failure of the aircraft design and few were produced.

Specifications (Cloudbuster)

References

1980s United States ultralight aircraft
Homebuilt aircraft
Single-engined tractor aircraft